Sukhvor-e Hajji Morad (also Romanized as Sūkhvor-e Ḩājjī Morād) is a village in Heydariyeh Rural District, Govar District, Gilan-e Gharb County, Kermanshah Province, Iran. At the 2006 census, its population was 108, in 26 families.

References 

Populated places in Gilan-e Gharb County